Juan Carlos Zuniga was the Mayor of San Pedro Sula from 2010 to 2014. He was elected mayor in the 2009 elections and took office on 25 January 2010. He is a member of the Liberal Party of Honduras.

References 

Living people
Mayors of places in Honduras
Liberal Party of Honduras politicians
Year of birth missing (living people)